Jacob (Jack) Shulman, (1914–1999), was an American anti-Revisionist Communist activist who fought in the Spanish Civil War and later moved to the People's Republic of China.

Background

Jacob Schulman was born and raised in Rochester, New York, to Jewish parents who had fled Tsarist Russia. His father was a housepainter and his mother a washerwoman. Shulman won a scholarship to college but had to leave due to the onset of the Great Depression.

Career

Shulman joined the Young Communist League in 1930 and went on in 1936 to serve with the Lincoln Brigade for 26 months during the Spanish Civil War and in United States Army during World War II. In the early 1950s he worked in the South as part of the Party's organizing efforts with African Americans. He was for several years William Z. Foster's secretary.

Shulman was dissatisfied by the  Communist Party USA's turn away from Marxism Leninism following Nikita Khrushchev's "Secret Speech" in 1956. Following his resignation from the Party, Shulman traveled to Albania and China in pursuit of his political objectives.

Shulman visited Albania then moved to China in 1968 and worked as an editor of English language publications during the Cultural Revolution in Beijing. As China itself began to display outward revisionist tendencies Shulman grew closer to the Party of Labour of Albania. He returned to the United States, published Albania Report and organized the USA-Albania Friendship Association. He had good relationships with the India-Albania Friendship Association and  Indian Marxist-Leninists. After the fall of communism in Albania he participated in the Alliance Marxist-Leninist (North America) and supported International Struggle Marxist-Leninist (ISML). He was associated with the British Marxist-Leninist W. B. Bland.  In 2008, former political associates of Shulman helped found the American Party of Labor.

Personal life

Shulman married three times. The ashes of his third wife, Ruth, are buried in the Martyr's Hill in Tirana.

Shulman died in 1999.

His son Norman, an American draft dodger who joined him in China during the Vietnam War, stayed behind in China for several years and met and later married Jan Wong, a Canadian student who later became a journalist.

References

External links
 Obituary
 Obituary in the journal International Struggle Marxist-Leninist
 Memorial Issue Alliance 38
 Interview with Jack Shulman Memorial Issue, Alliance 38

1914 births
1999 deaths
Abraham Lincoln Brigade members
American communists
Anti-revisionists
Hoxhaists
Jewish anti-fascists
Jewish socialists